The 2019–20 season was RB Leipzig's 11th season in existence and the club's fourth consecutive season in the top flight of German football. In addition to the domestic league, RB Leipzig participated in this season's edition of the DFB-Pokal, and also participated in the UEFA Champions League. The season was slated to cover a period from 1 July 2019 to 30 June 2020. It was extended extraordinarily beyond 30 June due to the COVID-19 pandemic in Germany.

Players

Squad information

Players out on loan

Transfers

Transfers in

Loans in

Transfers out

Loans out

Kits

Pre-season and friendlies

Competitions

Overview

Bundesliga

League table

Results summary

Results by round

Matches
The Bundesliga schedule was announced on 28 June 2019.

DFB-Pokal

UEFA Champions League

Group stage

Knockout phase

Statistics

Appearances and goals

|-
! colspan=14 style=background:#dcdcdc; text-align:center| Goalkeepers

|-
! colspan=14 style=background:#dcdcdc; text-align:center| Defenders

|-
! colspan=14 style=background:#dcdcdc; text-align:center| Midfielders

|-
! colspan=14 style=background:#dcdcdc; text-align:center| Forwards

|-
! colspan=14 style=background:#dcdcdc; text-align:center| Players transferred out during the season

|-

Goalscorers

Clean sheets

References

External links

RB Leipzig seasons
RB Leipzig
2019–20 UEFA Champions League participants seasons